Record Review is a Saturday morning radio programme (usually airing from 9am to 11:45am) dealing with recent classical music releases, topical issues and interviews. The programme title is a return of Record Review which was broadcast on Network Three occasionally from 1949, then weekly from 1957 presented by John Lade and then from 1981, Paul Vaughan, until 1998. , the regular presenter of Record Review is Andrew McGregor.

From 1998 to 2015 it became CD Review, with the format remaining largely the same. Then, from 2 January 2016, its title reverted to Record Review to reflect the diversity of media proliferating (CDs, downloads, streaming, and so forth).

It includes the feature Building a Library which surveys and recommends available recordings of specific works. In 2006  The Guardian'''s Martin Kettle attacked Building a Library''  as "elitist" for including such composers as Karl Amadeus Hartmann and Elliott Carter and lesser-known works of great composers, at the expense of well-known mainstream works. However, the charge was rebutted by the programme's producer, Mark Lowther, who said that Radio 3 audiences wanted programmes that challenged and inspired.

References

External links

1949 radio programme debuts
BBC Radio 3 programmes
British music radio programmes